Sharif Medical and Dental College (also known as Sharif Medical City) is a medical college in Lahore, Punjab, Pakistan.

Recognition and affiliation
 Accredited by the College of Physicians and Surgeons of Pakistan.
 Affiliated with the University of Health Sciences, Lahore.

Overview 
It was established in 1997. Equipped with one of the best campus in Punjab, SMDC is ranked as third in Private Medical and Dental Colleges of Punjab, in terms of results this college produced - top result (98% overall)

Board of trustees 
 Nawaz Sharif (Chairman)
 Shahbaz Sharif (Member)

References

External links 
 Sharif Medical City official website

Dental schools in Pakistan
Medical colleges in Punjab, Pakistan
Universities and colleges in Lahore
Educational institutions established in 1997
1997 establishments in Pakistan